Antonio Pergreffi (born 6 May 1988) is an Italian professional footballer who plays as a centre back for  club Modena.

Club career
On 16 July 2015, he joined Serie D club Lecco.

After one year in Lecco, on 7 July 2016 Pergreffi signed with Serie C club Piacenza. He played four seasons on Serie C for the club, he was also the team captain.

On 6 June 2020, he signed with Modena.

References

External links
 
 

2001 births
Living people
Footballers from Bergamo
Italian footballers
Association football defenders
Serie C players
Serie D players
A.C. Ponte San Pietro Isola S.S.D. players
Calcio Lecco 1912 players
Piacenza Calcio 1919 players
Modena F.C. 2018 players